Palacios Municipal Airport  is a city-owned, public-use airport located three nautical miles (6 km) northwest of the central business district of Palacios, a city in Matagorda County, Texas, United States. It is included in the National Plan of Integrated Airport Systems for 2011–2015, which categorized it as a general aviation facility.

History 
Camp Palacios was originally established as a summer training camp for the 36th Infantry Division of the TX National Guard after the Palacios Campsite Association donated the land to the state in 1926.  As a result of World War II, Palacios Army Airfield was constructed in 1943 and opened in August by the United States Army Air Forces as a maintenance depot and supply facility for Air Technical Service Command. At the end of the war the airfield was determined to be excess by the military and turned over to the local government for civil use.

Facilities and aircraft 
Palacios Municipal Airport covers an area of 1,538 acres (622 ha) at an elevation of 14 feet (4 m) above mean sea level. It has three runways with concrete surfaces: 8/26 is 5,001 by 150 feet (1,524 x 46 m); 13/31 is 5,001 by 150 feet (1,524 x 46 m); 17/35 is 5,001 by 75 feet (1,524 x 23 m).

For the 12-month period ending May 21, 2011, the airport had 2,960 aircraft operations, an average of 246 per month: 51% general aviation and 49% military. At that time there were 12 aircraft based at this airport: 75% single-engine and 25% helicopter.

See also 
 List of airports in Texas
 Texas World War II Army Airfields

References

External links 
 Palacios Municipal Airport at City of Palacios Economic Development Corporation website
 Palacios Area Historical Association
  at Texas DOT Airport Directory
 Aerial image as of March 1995 from USGS The National Map
 

Airports in Texas
Airports established in 1943
1943 establishments in Texas
Transportation in Matagorda County, Texas
Buildings and structures in Matagorda County, Texas
Airfields of the United States Army Air Forces in Texas
Airfields of the United States Army Air Forces Technical Service Command